was an exclave town that belongs to Higashimuro District, Wakayama, Japan, but was located on the border between Mie and Nara Prefectures.

As of 2003, the town had an estimated population of 1,972 and a density of 11.24 persons per km². The total area was 175.47 km².

On October 1, 2005, Kumanogawa was merged into the expanded city of Shingū.

External links
Official town website (in Japanese)

Dissolved municipalities of Wakayama Prefecture
Shingū, Wakayama
Enclaves and exclaves